The names Ommanney and Ommaney are English, and may refer to one of the following:

People with the surname
See Ommanney (surname)
 Henry Ommaney (1805–1829), English cricketer

People with the given name

 George Willes (1823–1901), a.k.a. Admiral Sir George Ommanney Willes, a Royal Navy officer and Commander-in-Chief, Portsmouth.
 John Ommanney Hopkins (1834–1916), a.k.a. Admiral Sir John Ommanney Hopkins, a Royal Navy officer and Commander-in-Chief, Mediterranean Fleet.

Places
 Mount Ommaney, Queensland, an outer suburb of Brisbane, Australia
 Ommanney Bay, an Arctic waterway in Qikiqtaaluk Region, Nunavut, Canada
 Ommanney Island a.k.a. Ostrov Ommani, a small island near Jackson Island, Franz Josef Land, Russia

Ships
, a Casablanca-class escort aircraft carrier of the United States Navy